

Gidgealpa is a locality in the Australian state of South Australia located about  north-east  of the capital city of Adelaide and about  south-west of the town of Innamincka.

The locality was established on 26 April 2013 in respect to “the long established local name.”  Its name is derived from the former pastoral lease.

The locality includes the company town of Moomba and the Moomba Airport.  The Strzelecki Track passes through the locality.

The principal land uses within the locality are primary production and conservation with the former being associated with the exploration for and the production of petroleum, and the latter concerning the Coongie Lakes Ramsar site which is located on the north-west side of the locality.

Gidgealpa is located within the federal Division of Grey, the state electoral district of Stuart, the Pastoral Unincorporated Area of South Australia and the state’s Far North region.

References

Notes

Citations

Towns in South Australia
Far North (South Australia)
Places in the unincorporated areas of South Australia